Moniza Alvi (born 2 February 1954) is a Pakistani-British poet and writer. She has won several well-known prizes for her verse.

Life and education
Moniza Alvi was born in Lahore, Pakistan, to a Pakistani father and a British mother. Her father moved to Hatfield, Hertfordshire, in England when Alvi was few months old. She did not revisit Pakistan until after the publication of one of her first books of poems – The Country at My Shoulder. She worked for several years as a high-school teacher but is currently a freelance writer and tutor, living in Norfolk.

Poetry
Peacock Luggage, a book of poems by Moniza Alvi and Peter Daniels, was published after the two poets jointly won the Poetry Business Prize in 1991, in Alvi's case for "Presents from my Aunts in Pakistan". That poem and "An Unknown Girl" have featured on England's GCSE exam syllabus for young teenagers.

Since then, Moniza Alvi has written four poetry collections. The Country at My Shoulder (1993) led to her being selected for the Poetry Society's New Generation Poets promotion in 1994. She also published a series of short stories, How the Stone Found its Voice (2005), inspired by Kipling's Just So Stories.

In 2002 she received a Cholmondeley Award for her poetry. In 2003 a selection of her poetry was published in a bilingual Dutch and English edition. A selection from her earlier books, Split World: Poems 1990–2005, was published in 2008.

On 16 January 2014, Alvi participated in the BBC Radio 3 series The Essay – Letters to a Young Poet. Taking Rainer Maria Rilke's classic text, Letters to a Young Poet as their inspiration, leading poets wrote a letter to a protégé.

Selected works

Poetry
Peacock Luggage (1991)
A Bowl Of Warm Air (1996)
Carrying my Wife (Bloodaxe Books, 2000) 
Souls (Bloodaxe, 2002) 
How the Stone Found Its Voice (Bloodaxe, 2005)  – which was inspired by Kipling's Just So Stories
Split World: Poems 1990–2005 (Bloodaxe, 2008) 
Europa (2008)
Homesick For The Earth (2011)

Recordings
The Poetry Quartets 6 with George Szirtes, Michael Donaghy and Anne Stevenson (Bloodaxe / British Council, 2001)

Further reading
Sonja Lehmann: Moniza Alvi's Europa. Rewriting Myth from a Feminist Postcolonial Perspective, in: Verorten - Verhandeln – Verkörpern. Interdisziplinäre Analysen zu Raum und Geschlecht, edited by Silke Förschler, Rebekka Habermas and Nikola Roßbach. Bielefeld, transcript Verlag 2014, pp. 41–60,

References

External links

Sawnet Profile

Listen to Moniza Alvi reading her poetry - a British Library recording, 27 October 2008.
BBC poetry reading 6 January 2009. (Audio, 3 mins)

1954 births
Living people
Pakistani people of English descent
British women poets
Alumni of the University of York
Poets from Lahore
Writers of Pakistani descent
Writers from Lahore
Pakistani emigrants to the United Kingdom
Pakistani women writers
British writers of Pakistani descent
Pakistani writers
Women writers from Punjab, Pakistan